Research in Developmental Disabilities is a bimonthly peer-reviewed medical journal covering developmental disabilities. It was formed in 1987 by the merger of Analysis and Intervention in Developmental Disabilities and Applied Research in Mental Retardation, which were established in 1981 and 1980, respectively. It is published by Elsevier and the editor-in-chief is Dagmara Dimitriou (UCL Institute of Education).

Abstracting and indexing
The journal is abstracted and indexed in:

According to the Journal Citation Reports, the journal has a 2021 impact factor of 3.635.

References

External links

Psychiatry journals
Elsevier academic journals
Publications established in 1987
Bimonthly journals
English-language journals